Wa'ala Al Raqab is a sub-district located in Nati' District, Al Bayda Governorate, Yemen.  Wa'ala Al Raqab had a population of 2105 according to the 2004 census.

References 

Sub-districts in Nati' District